Predictor may refer to:

 Branch predictor, a part of many modern processors
 Kerrison Predictor, a military fire-control computer
 Predictor variable, also known as an independent variable
 A type of railway level crossing, circuit that tries to achieve a constant warning time by predicting the speed of the approaching train
 Something which makes a prediction

See also 

 
 
 Prediction (disambiguation)
 Predict (disambiguation)

Indicators